, known by his stage name , is a Japanese singer-songwriter. He is best known as the vocalist of the band Funky Monkey Babys, which disbanded in 2013.

History
Funky Kato was working as a member of FUNKY MONKEY BABYS from the band's beginnings in 2004. They would go on to sign a major label contract in 2006. After their disbandment in June 2013, he started his solo career by going on a tour entitled Funky Kato's Insutoaraibu Tour from November to February of the next year.

He has since released three singles, one album and has been able to play at the Nippon Budokan.

He married his band's former manager on April 15, 2013.

Discography

Singles

References

External links 
Official website 
Funky Kato(@fmb_funkykato) – Twitter
Funky Kato Official – Facebook
Funky Kato Official Blog Powered by Ameba
Funky Kato Fan Club Site
Documentary Website 

Japanese male singer-songwriters
Japanese singer-songwriters
1978 births
Living people
Singers from Tokyo
21st-century Japanese singers
21st-century Japanese male singers